Deogracias Biribé Banké (born 27 March 1997) is an Equatorial Guinean footballer who plays as a defensive midfielder for Cano Sport Academy and the Equatorial Guinea national team.

International career
Biribé made his international debut for Equatorial Guinea on 28 July 2019.

References

1997 births
Living people
Association football midfielders
Equatoguinean footballers
Equatorial Guinea international footballers
Cano Sport Academy players
The Panthers F.C. players
Bubi people